BET Jams is an American pay television network controlled by BET Networks and owned by Paramount Media Networks. The channel features hip-hop and urban contemporary music videos. The network, formerly known as MTV Jams, was rebranded under the BET banner on October 5, 2015.

History

MTV Jams (2002–15) 

The channel launched in 2002, replacing MTVX, a hard rock, and heavy metal music network which launched on August 1, 1998. The replacement of MTVX by MTV Jams was explained by the network as being based on demographic trends and industry data that there was a lower demand for a channel devoted to hard rock and heavy metal than there was for hip-hop, rap, and R&B (African-American genres); as a result, Viacom management made the decision to launch a new music video network over MTVX's channel space. The network's name was taken from a two-hour daily program block on MTV, called MTV Jams, which ran from 1992 to 2000 and was also the general branding for urban music broadcast on the flagship channel.

After its launch, new videos were in heavy rotation and normally played once at least every two hours. MTV Jams was the last remaining MTV network in the U.S. to use MTV's original Kabel font for its music video credit tags, which the main MTV network discontinued in October 2007. MTV Jams shifted to the font style used by MTV Hits and rarely by MTV itself in May 2011.

The network's logo had a minor readjustment in February 2010 to remove the Music Television tagline and a small quarter of the logo in line with the official rebranding of all MTV networks. The network had its first full-fledged change in imaging on April 13, 2012, in line with the March 26 re-imaging of MTV Hits. A new logo and imaging were introduced on that date, featuring all text in bold Helvetica, including a minimal-style logo with the 2010 MTV logomark next to the word "Jams".

BET Jams (2015–present) 

The network was rebranded as BET Jams on October 5, 2015, to better align with BET (which the network itself stopped playing music videos and ended 106 & Park on December 19, 2014) The channel continues to play hip-hop and urban contemporary videos as MTV's mainline networks, including MTV itself and MTV2, draw down their dependence on them. With the rebrand, MTV Live (formerly Palladia) along with MTVU remains as the only MTV-branded 24/7 video formatted networks with a music focus. A block of MTV Jams-branded music videos remains on MTV Live daily, presumably to prevent trademark dilution.

Programming 

The channel uses an automated "wheel" schedule that was introduced during the early years of MTV2. A new loop starts at 6 a.m. Eastern Time and then repeats at 2 p.m. and 10 p.m., normally under the EPG-only title of Music Playlist with little theming of video blocks (MTV Classic is also based on a completely automated schedule, though not on a wheel). Traditional direct response and promotional advertising and other interstitial programming are also carried on the network, along with various theme programming to promote album releases or other happenings in the music world. Starting in Summer 2004, MTV Jams added some variety to its programming. Along with MTV Hits, MTV Jams began to play more obscure videos, as well as a larger selection of older videos, than it had recently played. The automated wheel remained with the changeover to BET, though segments connected to MTV or MTV.com were discontinued.

Currently, the breadth of BET Jams' playlist surpasses that of BET Soul, with several hundred more videos played on a regular basis. Most of the urban music videos that have ever aired on BET, MTV and VH1 are seen on Jams, as well as many more obscure urban videos that cannot be seen on any other Paramount-owned network, though normally the channel does not air music preceding the 1989 premiere of Yo! MTV Raps, except for a few small cases. The relaunch as BET Jams was tied to the 2015 BET Hip Hop Awards held nine days later, along with promotion for nominated artists and songs.

The network has a weekly "Jam of the Week" which is announced on Sundays, with the video chosen receiving extended plays throughout the week.

Former programming 
MTV Jams aired a frequent live game show, Hood Fab, hosted by Buttahman; in which two contestants (normally one popular hip hop artist and one random contestant off of the street, although there have been games where two artists went against each other) are asked questions about hip-hop. The contests take place in different cities. The one who answers the most questions correctly gets a bonus question, to which a prize is awarded to that contestant. The artist normally just receives bragging rights and the "Official Hood Fab tube socks" while the random contestant will receive a prize of higher value as well as the tube socks.

The channel also periodically aired a short-form program called The Parker Report, hosted by Erik Parker; in each episode, Parker featured hip-hop artists, normally under a theme (for instance, one episode featured the Grand Hustle team of T.I., Alfamega, and Big Kuntry King) to talk about issues in hip-hop. In the aforementioned episode, the four discussed the autotune "T-Pain" effect and about how he rediscovered it. The panel came to a conclusion about the issue discussed; for instance, the guests and host came to the conclusion to, when using the autotune, either "shout out" to T-Pain or feature him on the record.

The network also aired the Ozone Awards for several years under a brokered programming arrangement.

Marathons 
Occasionally, the network has broadcast special, unannounced alphabetical marathons of music videos by artist name, normally around holiday periods, or videos themed around lists such as most popular of the year, nominated for certain awards or that of an artist around the release of a new album.

Themed blocks 
From time to time, the network is also known to include special themed blocks of programming, for example, an hour of a specific artist or label's videos, an hour block of 1990s gangsta rap, or a string of reggae-style videos. These are always unannounced and spontaneous for viewers, in the vein of MTV2's original format.

In Fall 2004, MTV Jams presented a week of shows titled "Takeover", where artists were invited to host a day of programming. Artists included Usher, Kanye West, Lil Jon, Nelly, and Fat Joe (a format eventually picked up by competitor Fuse as the network drastically reduced their original programming due to budget issues). Each artist played their favorite videos and their own videos. Additionally, MTV specials such as Diary and live performance footage was played that related to the artists. This may have marked the first time the channel has ever aired any non-music video programming. In March 2005, MTV Jams invited 50 Cent to its studios to introduce his and his posse's music videos, as well as to play some of his favorite old school videos. He also spoke briefly between videos about his newest album and about his musical inspirations. At the time, these two specials were the closest to a VJ-presented program to ever appear on the channel.

Fab 5 of Summer '05 
During Summer 2005, MTV Jams introduced a new, larger logo in order to promote special programming called "The Fab 5 of Summer '05" that was running on the channel for the duration of that season. The "Fab 5" were five up-and-coming hip-hop artists that the channel placed a heavy emphasis on during the entire summer; these artists were Juelz Santana, Da Back Wudz, Young Jeezy, Tony Yayo, and Paul Wall. Da Back Wudz, Young Jeezy, Tony Yayo, and Paul Wall came into the MTV Jams studio to speak about their careers and to play blocks of their favorite videos. These blocks were rotated very heavily, sometimes several times a day, as such Summer 2005 had arguably become the period of MTV Jams' history that has seen the most redundant and least varied playlist to date.

That same summer, MTV Jams moved one step closer toward its high-budget, show-based sister networks MTV and VH1 when it briefly aired documentary style programs on the hip-hop themed and MTV-produced film Hustle and Flow.

Availability 
BET Jams is available on the high-tier packages of most pay television providers, but was not available on Dish Network until 2016 (it remains unavailable on DirecTV). This is an artifact of the network's former editorial and operational control under Paramount Media Networks, where the channel was part of the digital cable-exclusive MTV/Nickelodeon Digital Suite.

Time Warner Cable recently did not carry the network except on systems it owned that were formerly operated by Adelphia Communications, systems where previous contracts with MTV Networks are required to be honored, and Bright House Networks, of which Time Warner Cable had a stake in before both were a part of the 2017 merger into Charter Communications as Spectrum. This resulted in the network being unavailable in New York City outside of areas serviced by Cablevision; TWC was before the merger, the major cable provider for Manhattan, Staten Island, Brooklyn and Queens. MTV Jams and its sister networks were added in Summer 2012 as part of a wider agreement between Viacom and Time Warner Cable to allow access to its networks over TWC's tablet applications, along with its mobile apps.

The network is also carried on some pay-television providers in Latin America.

References

External links 
 
 

African-American television
Television channels and stations established in 1998
English-language television stations in the United States
BET Networks
Music video networks in the United States
African-American television networks